(Japanese:グランブルーファンタジー, Hepburn: Guranburū Fantajī) is a Japanese social-network game and role-playing video game developed by Cygames for Android, iOS and web browsers, which first released in Japan in March 2014. The game reunites music composer Nobuo Uematsu and art director Hideo Minaba, who previously collaborated on Final Fantasy V (1992), Final Fantasy VI (1994), Final Fantasy IX (2000) and Lost Odyssey (2007).

Gameplay
The game plays as a role-playing video game with turn-based battles. The game also contains summons and a class system that alters the main character's move-set and growth.  Characters gain levels and abilities by accruing experience; by collecting certain materials, some character may earn an extra star (which is called "FLB" or full limit break) summons and weapons equipped also confer characters with bonuses on attack power and HP.  The characters themselves are gained either via quests (the main story quests or special event quests) or by using in-game currency to receive random crystal fragments, which may contain special weapons that add specific characters to the party.  Characters, summons, and weapons are ranked (from best to worst) as SSR, SR, R, or N; each is also of type wind, water, fire, earth, light, or darkness. It is recommended to use a superior element on battle (for example using water against fire) as some dungeon giving a penalty to the non-superior element. Voice actors provide voices for all of the characters in battle, and for much of the main and event story lines including tie-in/collaboration's characters and stories.

Plot

Act 1: Girl in Blue

The Captain (Japanese: 団長, Danchō) (the player character, either Gran (Male) or Djeeta (Female) by default) and their winged companion Vyrn are relaxing in the town of Zinkenstill, when they spot an Erste Empire airship in the sky nearby. The Captain inadvertently comes to the rescue of a girl named Lyria and an Imperial Officer named Katalina as they try to escape from the Empire. However, the Captain suffers a mortal wound during the fight, forcing Lyria to merge her soul with them in order to bring them back from the brink of death. Lyria then uses her power to summon a giant monster called Proto-Bahamut, driving the Empire's forces away. With the Captain and Katalina's fates now tied to Lyria, the three of them decide to head to the island of Estalucia, both to escape from the Empire and possibly find clues about the Captain's estranged father.

Unfortunately, Katalina's poor piloting skills cause them to crash-land elsewhere in the Port Breeze Archipelago. The trio look for a working airship and a pilot to steer it. They end up meeting Rackam, an odd helmsman working on an airship that has been broken for years. However, the Empire follows them to the island as well, looking to recapture Lyria. The three eventually manage to convince Rackam to help them fight off the Imperial soldiers chasing them, and in return help him finish repairing his airship, the Grandcypher, to make it skyworthy.

As the Captain travels across the skies, gathering up more allies on their journey and fighting Primal Beasts, creatures created by those many years ago, the crew find themselves slowly dragged into a plot involving the mysterious Black Knight, the doll-like Orchis, and the history that the Empire seeks to keep secret while they pursue Lyria.

Act 2: Dawning Sky

After thwarted Freesia's ambitions and collected the remaining Skydom Map Pieces, with the completed Phantagrande Skydom Map, they manage to break thru the miasma of the Grim Basin, but due to Loki's manipulation the Grandcypher crew were separated. The destination they have arrived was the unified kingdom that was destroyed ten years ago, it was the Nalhegrande Skydom. As the Main characters and Katalina have safety gathered in one place, they had met a young man named Cain on Melkmaar Island where they had drifted to.

Act 3: Wayfaring Astral

After preventing The True King from taking over the Nalhe Great Wall, the Grandcypher Crew went to chase after the Main Character who had fell from the collapsing island who had rescued Alliah.

Development
Uematsu worked on eleven tracks for the game, with Tsutomu Narita doing nine others, and Minaba drawing roughly 100 potential character designs. The game also contains voice overs from Hiroaki Hirata as Rackam, who previously worked on Final Fantasy XII and Dissidia 012 Final Fantasy.

The game was originally planned for release in Japan for December 17, 2013, but it was put back to March 10, 2014. The game is free-to-play and published by Mobage. At TGS 2015, it was announced that the game would receive an international release in March 2016. Instead of an international launch, a language patch was released adding an in-game option to switch from Japanese to English. This allows international players who have been playing the Japanese version to keep all of their data.

The designs were created from subsidiary company CyDesignation that had created designs for different series such as a few Final Fantasy series (Lightning Returns Final Fantasy XIII, MOBIUS FINAL FANTASY and Final Fantasy Legends Space-Time Crystal), LORD of VERMILION III, Bravely Second and Tokyo Mirage Sessions ♯FE. Granblue Fantasy's character designs were done by Hideo Minaba, Yuya Nagai, Ryoji Ohara, Ryota Murayama and Hitomi Yoshimura. Scenery designs by Sotaro Hori, Hitomi Yoshimura, Yutaro Kaneda, Megumi Hasegawa, Masaki Hirooka, YUU Kikuchi, Toronn and Fumio Seno.

Reception

By March 2016, the game had been downloaded over 10 million times in Japan, which had risen to over 25million by December 2019. The game grossed  between January 2017 and October 2017. In 2018, it grossed  where it was the year's sixth highest-grossing mobile game. Combined, the game grossed at least  in Japan between 2017 and 2018. Many journalists compared it favorably to earlier Final Fantasy games.

On 31st December of 2015. Due to the proven lucrative system of the game economy, as some players compulsively attempt to get desired characters via spending money on repeated random character acquisitions. It was so effective to the point of raising worries of government regulation to stop exploitation; the Japan Online Game Association imposed stricter restrictions on the industry after a player streamed themselves spending around 700,000 (~6,000 US dollars) attempting to get Andira, a new and heavily advertised character, on December 31, 2015.  There was a time-limited period where Andira's appearance rate increased, with her becoming more difficult to acquire on January 3, fueling "delirium" and pressure on players to attempt to get her immediately.  Frustration and claims of Andira's "drop rate" being less than advertised from other players as well led developer Cygames to offer compensation in crystals to people caught in the incident, a promise to set up a system to automatically give a drop after too many "misses", and an apology from the management. On 8th January, the management had issued an in-game apology for the confusion and discomfort caused to the rest of the customers. However, no compensation has been announced for the apology. After the change in policy, players choose and immediately acquire a desired character after spending 90,000 crystals (totaling 300 draws).

Other media

Animation 

Granblue Fantasy The Animation (2017),  an anime series adaption of the franchise. A-1 Pictures produced it in the Spring 2017 season.
Granblue Fantasy The Animation Season 2 (2019), began airing in Japan in the Fall 2019 season.  The voice cast of Season 2 remained mostly the same as Season 1, but the production staff were almost entirely different as the studio was changed to MAPPA.
Grand Blues! (2020), an anime adaptation of the 4-panel comedy manga by Kikuhitomoji.  DMM.futureworks produced it in the Fall 2020 season.

Video game 

Granblue Fantasy Versus, 2.5D animated console fighting video game series, developed by Arc System Works for the PlayStation 4 and 5, and PC via Steam.
 The first game of Granblue Fantasy Versus was announced at Granblue Fantasy Fes in December, 2018. It was first released on PlayStation 4 and later ported to PC via Steam. Versus initially planned to release in 2019, and the closed beta test was held from May 8 to May 24. The game was officially released on Feb 6, 2020, according to the latest announcement at "Granblue Summer Fes" in August.
 The sequel known as Granblue Fantasy Versus: Rising was announced at GBVS Cygames Cup Special in January 2023, and set to be released around the same year, which also adds PlayStation 5 port. In additions to returning contents from the first game, it features new playable characters, stages and storyline, updated graphics and gameplay systems, lobby avatar mini games, rollback netcode and crossplay.
Granblue Fantasy: Relink (2023), an upcoming action role-playing game developed by Cygames Osaka (replacing the originally announced PlatinumGames).

Notes

References

External links
  
  

 
2014 video games
Action-adventure games
Action video games
Android (operating system) games
Browser games
Cygames franchises
Fantasy video games
Gacha games
IOS games
Japan-exclusive video games
Japanese role-playing video games
Mass media franchises
Multiplayer video games
Role-playing video games
Science fantasy video games
Science fiction video games
Single-player video games
Video games developed in Japan
Video games about parallel universes
Video games featuring female protagonists
Video game franchises
Video games scored by Nobuo Uematsu
Video games set on fictional islands
Video games adapted into television shows